LGBTQ+ Athletes Claim the Field: Striving for Equality, written by Kirstin Cronn-Mills and published August 1, 2016 by Twenty-First Century Books, is a nonfiction book about queer athletes and how their status has changed—and still needs to change.

Reception 
LGBTQ+ Athletes Claim the Field received a starred review from Booklist, who highlighted how, Cronn-Mills "humanizes" homophobic and transphobic prejudice and discrimination "with her numerous profiles of LGBTQ+ athletes. Though succinct ..., hers is an important contribution to the blossoming field of LGBTQ+ literature." 

Kirkus Reviews indicated that the book has "high appeal for both athletes and those who support LGBTQ rights" and that Cronn-Mills uses "clear, readable text" to discuss the prejudices against LGBT+ athletes. School Library Journal recommended the book for "libraries with strong interest in sports history or LGBTQIA topics" and wrote, "While all of the stories of these athletes are individually compelling, a few organizational stumbles interrupt the flow. The connections between sidebars and the larger text are not always clear and can often be quite tenuous." They further highlighted that "the detailed time line in the back matter ... effectively communicates a narrative of major events and progress over time. Crisp color photographs, usually of athletes on or off the field, enhance the text throughout and visually reinforce the message that athletics are for everyone."

LGBTQ+ Athletes Claim the Field is a Junior Library Guild book.

References 

LGBT non-fiction books
Books about sports
2010s LGBT literature
2016 non-fiction books